"Never Give Up on You" is a song released by Welsh singer Lucie Jones, on January 27, 2017. The song represented the United Kingdom in the Eurovision Song Contest 2017. It was written by Daniel Salcedo, Lawrie Martin, and Emmelie de Forest, the latter of whom won the Eurovision Song Contest 2013 with the song "Only Teardrops". A new version of the song, and music video was released on 11 March 2017. The single peaked at number seventy three on the UK Singles Chart. It finished 15th place with 111 points, giving the United Kingdom their best result in the contest since 2011.

Track listing

Charts

Release history

Lasse Meling version

Danish singer Lasse Meling released a version of the song on April 14, 2017 through AEM Records and Sony Music. The song was produced by Daniel Salcedo and Rune Braager.

Track listing
Digital download
"Never Give Up on You" – 2:42

References

2017 singles
2016 songs
Eurovision songs of the United Kingdom
Eurovision songs of 2017
Songs written by Emmelie de Forest